Jonathan "Dana" Wilson (22 May 1983 – 4 September 2011) was a New Zealand professional rugby league footballer who represented the Cook Islands.

Playing career
Wilson played lower grades for Manly for a season before moving to England in 2005. He played for Oldham Bears, Leigh (Heritage № 1267) and Halifax before joining Swinton in 2009. He scored the match-winning try for Leigh in the 2006 Northern Rail Cup Final against Hull Kingston Rovers.

He was a key member of Swinton Lions' promotion-winning team in Championship 1 in 2011.

Representative career
Wilson represented New Zealand Under‑16's and Under‑18's before switching his allegiance to the Cook Islands, where his mother was born (his dad was born in Samoa).

Wilson played in the Pacific Cup, toured Fiji and played for the Cook Islands in the 2006 World Cup qualifiers.

Personal life
Wilson lived in Newton-le-Willows, Merseyside, England, with his wife Kirsten and their three children.

Death
Wilson was killed in a car accident on Forshaw Lane, Burtonwood, Cheshire, England, on 4 September 2011.

References

1983 births
2011 deaths
Cook Islands national rugby league team players
Expatriate rugby league players in England
Halifax R.L.F.C. players
Leigh Leopards players
New Zealand emigrants to the United Kingdom
New Zealand expatriate rugby league players
New Zealand expatriate sportspeople in England
New Zealand sportspeople of Cook Island descent
New Zealand sportspeople of Samoan descent
New Zealand rugby league players
Oldham R.L.F.C. players
Road incident deaths in England
Rugby league players from Auckland
Rugby league props
Swinton Lions players